MiCorps, the Michigan Clean Water Corps, is a network of volunteer water monitoring programs in Michigan. It was created through an executive order by Governor Jennifer Granholm to assist the Michigan Department of Environmental Quality (DEQ) in collecting and sharing water quality data for use in water resources management and protection programs.

External links

MiCorps: Michigan Clean Water Corps (official site)

Government of Michigan